Wegan is an unincorporated community in Brownstown Township, Jackson County, Indiana.

According to one source, the community may have been named for the Wegand family (different spelling) of settlers.

Geography

References

Unincorporated communities in Jackson County, Indiana
Unincorporated communities in Indiana